Emma McDonald (née Randall) (born 5 June 1985) is an Australian professional basketball player for the Bulleen Boomers in the Women's National Basketball League.

She attended the Australian Institute of Sport. Standing at 188 cm, Randall currently plays centre for the Boomers.  She previously played for the Dandenong Rangers and was part of their WNBL championship winning team in 2004/05.

She played at the 2001 Youth Olympics in Sydney.

References

External links
Player Biography - WNBL Official site.

Living people
1985 births
Australian women's basketball players
Basketball players at the 2008 Summer Olympics
Olympic basketball players of Australia
Olympic silver medalists for Australia
Tarbes Gespe Bigorre players
People educated at Carey Baptist Grammar School
Olympic medalists in basketball
Logan Thunder players
Melbourne Boomers players
Australian Institute of Sport basketball (WNBL) players
Medalists at the 2008 Summer Olympics